Shelley Andrews (born 24 June 1953 in Victoria, British Columbia) is a Canadian former field hockey player who competed in the 1984 Summer Olympics.

References

External links
 
 
 
 

1953 births
Living people
Field hockey players from Victoria, British Columbia
Canadian female field hockey players
Olympic field hockey players of Canada
Field hockey players at the 1984 Summer Olympics